Salinarimonas  is a genus of bacteria from the order of Hyphomicrobiales.

References

Hyphomicrobiales
Bacteria genera